Jonathas is a given name. Notable people with the name include:

Jonathas de Jesus (born 1989), Brazilian footballer
Jonathas Granville (1785–1839), Haitian educator, legal expert, soldier, and diplomat

Other
David et Jonathas, French opera

See also
Jonathan (name)